Stickney railway station is a former station that served the village of Stickney, in East Lindsey, Lincolnshire. The station was on the Kirkstead and Little Steeping Railway which ran between Lincoln and Firsby. The line was sometimes called the "New Line". It was opened in 1913 and closed in 1970. The site has since been redeveloped with nothing left of the station.

References

Disused railway stations in Lincolnshire
Former Great Northern Railway stations
Railway stations in Great Britain opened in 1913
Railway stations in Great Britain closed in 1915
Railway stations in Great Britain opened in 1923
Railway stations in Great Britain closed in 1970
1913 establishments in England
Beeching closures in England